The Hansjakob Way I, also called the Little Hansjakob Way (Kleiner Hansjakobweg), is a three-day circular walk in the Central Black Forest in Germany. It begins and ends in Schapbach, a village in the municipality of Bad Rippoldsau-Schapbach, between Wolfach and Freudenstadt.

The roughly 44-kilometre-long hiking trail is named after the Baden author and parish priest, Heinrich Hansjakob (1837–1916). The path was opened in 1981 and is sponsored and maintained by the Black Forest Club.

The walk runs to the settings for Hansjakob's stories, Erzbauern (1899), Waldleute (1897) and Abendläuten. The waymark is a white diamond with a black Hansjakob hat, the headwear in which Hansjakob is portrayed in many contemporary pictures and photographs. At all the sights along the way, information boards have been erected, that relate mainly to the life and stores of Hansjakob.

Day tours/stages

First Stage: Schapbach – Wittichen Abbey – Schenkenzell  
Schapbach – Schmiedsberger Platz – Kaltbrunner Tal – Wittichen Abbey (12.5 kilometres) – Vortal – Schenkenzell (16.5 kilometres)

Second Stage: Schenkenzell – St. Roman – Wolftal (Gasthaus Ochsen) 
Schenkenzell – Wittichen Abbey – Salzlecke – Heubach – Teufelstein – St. Roman (Sulzbächletal) – Kohlplatz – Bäch – Schapbach – Wolftal (Gasthaus Ochsen) (22.5 kilometres – from Wittichen Abbey only 18.5 kilometres)

Third Stage: Wolftal – Wildschapbach – Schapbach 
Wolftal (Gasthaus Ochsen) – Schwarzenbruch (Oberwolfach) – Hirschbach – Wildschapbach – Schapbach (13 kilometres)

Literature 
 Martin Kuhnle: Schwarzwald Mitte/Nord. Bergverlag Rother, Munich, 2013, pp. 154–165.

External links 

 Black Forest hiking service: web facility of the Black Forest Club for visualising the Black Forest trails on Google Maps with various overlays (trail network, waymarks, accommodation, …)

Hiking trails in Baden-Württemberg
Freudenstadt (district)
Transport in the Black Forest